Major General Majid-ul-Haq (1926 - 25 March 2013) was a Bangladeshi Army officer and a minister of the Government of Bangladesh.

Early life
Haq was born in Magura in 1926. He grew up in Delhi where his father was working in the Indian Central Government. After completing his schooling from Raisina Bengali High School, he went on to do his Intermediate at the Hindu College. He then enrolled in BA (Honours) in English at the same college. However, the death of his father forced him to rethink his career and he switched to engineering at the Bengal College of Engineering, Shibpur. In 1946, he joined the British Indian Army and underwent training at the Indian Military Academy. In 1947, he was transferred to Pakistan and commissioned as a Regular Officer in the Pakistan Army, subsequently joining the Corps of Engineers. He had various field and staff postings in both East and West Pakistan: Sialkot, Mardan, Risalpur, Kashmir, Rawalpindi, Dhaka, Quetta, Karachi and the Karakoram Heights. He was also briefly deputed to the Planning Department at Dhaka. He attended the Command and General Staff College at Fort Leavenworth, Leavenworth County, Kansas, United States, but was recalled when the 1965 War broke out between India and Pakistan. He was also posted to the Pakistan Navy in Karachi.
 
After the declaration of martial law in 1969, he was posted as Deputy Martial Law Administrator in East Pakistan. A disagreement with one of his erstwhile West Pakistani colleagues led to his being sent back to General Headquarters in Rawalpindi before the 1970 elections. In September 1971 he and his family were moved to detention camps, first in Kohat then in Mandi Bahauddin.

Life in Bangladesh
Repatriated to independent Bangladesh in 1973, he served in various capacities: Chairman Bangladesh Steel Corporation special Secretary with the rank and status of State Minister, Minister for Industries, establishment, Water Resources, Port and Shipping. Jute and Textiles, and Agriculture under various governments. He played an active role in the movement for the restoration of democracy against President Ershad. In June 1996 he resigned from the Standing Committee of the Bangladesh Nationalist Party, and in 2001 from the party. Majid-ul-Haq's memoir, ‘Unknown, Unhonoured and Unsung’ (Writers Ink, 2012), illuminates his skill as a story teller and describes the political and social reality of the time in a humorous and personal way.
 
Major General Majid-ul-Haq died on 25 March 2013. His wife, Mumtaz Jahan Zeb-Un-Nisa Majid, died 10 days before he did.

References

1926 births
2013 deaths
Bangladeshi generals
Bangladeshi male writers
Bangladesh Army generals
5th Jatiya Sangsad members
6th Jatiya Sangsad members
People from Magura District